Appathurai Vinayagamoorthy (19 December 1933 – 28 May 2017) was a Sri Lankan Tamil lawyer, politician and Member of Parliament. He was leader and president of the All Ceylon Tamil Congress.

Early life
Vinayagamoorthy was born on 19 December 1933.

Political career
Vinayagamoorthy was a long-standing member of the All Ceylon Tamil Congress (ACTC). He was one of the ACTC's candidates in Jaffna District at the 1989 parliamentary election but the ACTC failed to win any seats in Parliament. He took on the leadership of the party following the assassination of Kumar Ponnambalam in January 2000. He was the ACTC candidate for Jaffna District at the 2000 parliamentary election. He was elected and entered Parliament. He relinquished leadership of the ACTC to Ponnambalam's son Gajendrakumar Ponnambalam when he entered politics in 2001.

On 20 October 2001 the ACTC, Eelam People's Revolutionary Liberation Front, Tamil Eelam Liberation Organization and Tamil United Liberation Front formed the Tamil National Alliance (TNA). Vinayagamoorthy contested the 2001 parliamentary election as one of the TNA's candidates in Jaffna District. He was elected and re-entered Parliament. He was one of the TNA's candidates in Vanni District at the 2004 parliamentary election but failed to get elected after coming sixth amongst the TNA candidates.

Gajendrakumar Ponnambalam left the TNA in 2010, taking the ACTC with him but Vinayagamoorthy stayed with the TNA. He was one of the TNA's candidates in Jaffna District at the 2010 parliamentary election. He was elected and re-entered Parliament. He was not chosen to contest the 2015 parliamentary election.

Electoral history

References

1933 births
2017 deaths
All Ceylon Tamil Congress politicians
Members of the 11th Parliament of Sri Lanka
Members of the 12th Parliament of Sri Lanka
Members of the 14th Parliament of Sri Lanka
People from Northern Province, Sri Lanka
Sri Lankan Hindus
Sri Lankan Tamil lawyers
Sri Lankan Tamil politicians
Tamil National Alliance politicians